Ben Hutton (born April 20, 1993) is a Canadian professional ice hockey defenceman currently playing with the Vegas Golden Knights of the National Hockey League (NHL). Hutton was drafted 147th overall by the Vancouver Canucks in the 2012 NHL Entry Draft.

Hutton played Junior A with the Kemptville 73's and Nepean Raiders of the Central Canada Hockey League before joining the college hockey ranks with the Maine Black Bears of the Hockey East league. Hutton earned All-Hockey East First Team honours during his college career. Internationally, he represented Canada at the 2011 World Junior A Challenge, winning silver, and played for Canada at the 2016 IIHF World Championship in Moscow, winning gold.

Playing career

College
Hutton played for the Maine Black Bears in the NCAA Men's Division I Hockey East conference. In his second year, Hutton's outstanding play was rewarded with a selection to the 2013–14 All-Hockey East first team.

Professional

Vancouver Canucks
Following his junior season with the Black Bears, on March 16, 2015, Hutton was signed to a two-year, entry-level contract with the Canucks. He was then assigned to their American Hockey League (AHL) affiliate, the Utica Comets, to finish the 2014–15 season.

On October 5, 2015, Hutton was named to the Canucks' roster to start the 2015–16 NHL season, despite having been expected to begin the year with Utica. He made his NHL debut on October 7, 2015, earning his first career point, an assist, setting up Jannik Hansen for the game's opening goal in an eventual 5–1 win against the Calgary Flames. He scored his first NHL goal on January 17, 2016, against goaltender Jaroslav Halák in a game against the New York Islanders, which the Canucks won 2–1 in a shootout. Hutton finished his rookie season with 1 goal and 24 assists for 25 points in 75 games played, and was named the team's most outstanding defenceman, recognized by the Babe Pratt Trophy.

On November 24, 2016, Hutton signed a two-year, $5.6 million contract extension with the Canucks.

Los Angeles Kings
After not being tendered a contract by Vancouver during the 2019 offseason, Hutton became an unrestricted free-agent. On September 17, 2019, he signed a one-year, $1.5 million contract with the Kings.

Anaheim Ducks
As a free agent entering the pandemic delayed 2020–21 season, Hutton belatedly joined the Anaheim Ducks training camp on professional tryout basis. On January 15, 2021, the Ducks signed Hutton to a one-year, $950,000 contract for the remainder of the  season. He skated in 34 regular season games with the Ducks, collecting 1 goal and 5 points.

Toronto Maple Leafs
With the Ducks well out of playoff contention, Hutton was dealt at the trade deadline to add blueline depth to the Toronto Maple Leafs, in exchange for a fifth-round draft pick in 2022 on April 12, 2021. Hutton would play in four regular season games with Toronto, but was a healthy scratch for the team during the post-season. At the end of the season, Hutton was not offered a contract by the Maple Leafs.

Vegas Golden Knights
With the  season underway, Hutton remained un-signed as a free agent. With the Golden Knights depleted through injury, Hutton was signed to a one-year, $750,000 contract with the Vegas Golden Knights on October 28, 2021.

Hutton signed a two-year, $1.7 million contract extension with Vegas on March 5, 2022.

International play

Hutton represented Canada East at the 2011 World Junior A Challenge in Langley, British Columbia. He scored a goal and two assists in four games as Canada East won silver, losing to Canada West in the gold medal game.

Hutton represented Team Canada at the 2016 IIHF World Championship in Russia, alongside Vancouver Canucks teammate Christopher Tanev.

Career statistics

Regular season and playoffs

International

Awards and honours

References

External links 

1993 births
Living people
Anaheim Ducks players
Canadian ice hockey defencemen
Ice hockey people from Ontario
Los Angeles Kings players
Maine Black Bears men's ice hockey players
Nepean Raiders players
People from Leeds and Grenville United Counties
Toronto Maple Leafs players
Utica Comets players
Vancouver Canucks draft picks
Vancouver Canucks players
Vegas Golden Knights players
AHCA Division I men's ice hockey All-Americans